The Francis Xavier Cathedral, Banská Bystrica (usually called Kapitulský kostol meaning "Chapter Church") is a cathedral at Slovak National Uprising Square in Banská Bystrica, Slovakia.

There was a first mention of a gothic chapel at this spot in the so-called Königsberger's testament from 1503. It was the only place of Roman Catholic worship during the 16th century, when Banská Bystrica was in the hands of the Protestants.

In 1647 a few Jesuits settled here and started the Catholic reform of the town and its neighbourhood. During the years 1695–1701 they built their own college on the Königberger's site. They started the building of the church in 1702 as a copy of the Church of the Gesu in Rome.

The construction came to a halt when in 1703 when the town was occupied by the anti-Habsburg troops of Francis II Rákóczi. The building resumed in 1709 and on 24 September 1715 the church of St. Francis Xavier was consecrated. At that time, the church was a baroque building with a single nave and six chapels. The façade lacked a tower. In 1773 the Jesuits had to leave the church when in July 1773 the Order was suppressed by Pope Clement XIV. The cathedral has been the seat of the Diocese of Banská Bystrica since 1776.

The two onion-shaped towers were added in 1844 during an extensive rebuilding. The nave of the church and the side galleries were lengthened and a consistory was added to the church.

Another modification was performed in 1880. The  towers were rearranged and a romantic balustrade was added. In the 1970s the interior was refurbished and, together with the façade, was painted. The exterior was renovated in 1999. In 2003 a new pipe organ was installed.

See also
 List of cathedrals in Slovakia
 List of Jesuit sites

References

Buildings and structures in Banská Bystrica
Roman Catholic cathedrals in Slovakia
Roman Catholic churches completed in 1715
18th-century Roman Catholic church buildings in Slovakia
Churches in Banská Bystrica Region
Neoclassical church buildings in Slovakia